Gary Vogel is a retired American soccer defender who played professionally in the North American Soccer League and the Major Indoor Soccer League.

Vogel attended Hartwick College where he played on the men's soccer team from 1975 to 1977.  He turned professional in 1978 with the Minnesota Kicks of the North American Soccer League.  In 1981, he moved to the Dallas Tornado for a single season.  He then moved indoors with the New Jersey Rockets of the Major Indoor Soccer League.  After a single season with the Rockets, he moved to the Cleveland Force for the 1982-1983 season.  He played for the Houston Dynamos of the United Soccer League in 1984 and continued to play for the team until at least 1989 by which time the team was playing in the Lone Star Soccer Alliance.

References

External links
NASL/MISL stats

1956 births
American soccer players
Cleveland Force (original MISL) players
Dallas Tornado players
Hartwick Hawks men's soccer players
Houston Dynamos players
Living people
Lone Star Soccer Alliance players
Major Indoor Soccer League (1978–1992) players
North American Soccer League (1968–1984) indoor players
North American Soccer League (1968–1984) players
Minnesota Kicks players
New Jersey Rockets (MISL) players
United Soccer League (1984–85) players
Association football defenders